Paul Radu is an investigative journalist based in Bucharest, Romania. He is the director of the Organized Crime and Corruption Reporting Project, for which he and cofounder Drew Sullivan received the Special Award by the European Press Prize. He is also one of the cofounders of the Romanian Center for Investigative Journalism. He investigates transnational crime in Eastern Europe. He has received multiple international awards for his journalism. He believes that journalists should not be activists, but should rather trust that objective journalism is a sufficient contribution to whatever causes one might otherwise advocate. He teaches at the Balkan Investigative Reporting Network Summer School of Investigative Reporting. In 2008, he sat on a Central European Initiative jury to name that year's best investigative journalist; the jury chose Drago Hedl. In 2009, he appeared on 48 Hours investigating sexual slavery and human trafficking in Romania. He has also investigated human trafficking in Bosnia and Herzegovina.

 Radu is being sued for defamation in London by Azerbaijani MP, Javanshir Feyziyev, over two articles in OCCRP's award-winning Azerbaijan Laundromat series about money-laundering out of Azerbaijan. His colleague Khadija Ismayilova OCCRP's lead reporter in Azerbaijan, is a key witness in the case, but detained in December 2014, sentenced in September 2015 to seven-and-a-half years in prison on trumped-up charges, conditionally released in May 2016, and subject to a travel ban and has been unable to leave the country despite numerous applications to do so.

References

Living people
Investigative journalists
Romanian journalists
Crime journalists
Forced prostitution
Women's rights in Romania
Corruption in Romania
Organized crime in Romania
Human trafficking in Romania
Year of birth missing (living people)